Power Punch II is a boxing video game released for the Nintendo Entertainment System (NES) in 1992. The game was developed by Beam Software under supervision from Nintendo , until the latter disowned the production of the game, and as a result, it was published by American Softworks Corp. Despite its title, there was no previous "Power Punch" game.  However, Beam Software would use Power Punch II'''s engine again with George Foreman's KO Boxing on multiple systems the same year.

Storyline
Mark "Tough Guy" Tyler is the undefeated heavyweight champion of the world, with an Olympic gold medal and a 33-0 (30 KO) record to his claim. After knocking out another opponent with ease, Tyler and his manager taunt the world by saying that nobody can stop him. However, the broadcast is picked up far from Earth in the outer reaches of the universe by an alien boxing promoter for the Intergalactic Boxing Federation (IGBF). The promoter decides to accept Tyler's challenge that he can beat "anybody". Thus Tyler is brought into the throes of the universe to compete against the best fighters in the universe and defend his earthly title.

Gameplay
The game includes a scoring system based on punch percentages as well as knockdowns. Rounds are only one minute long.

Development
Originally, the game was to feature real life heavyweight boxer Mike Tyson as its protagonist and was titled Mike Tyson's Intergalactic Power Punch. A prototype featuring Mike Tyson was leaked in 2009. However, Beam Software changed the protagonist's name, possibly due to Tyson's mounting legal troubles. There are no previous titles in the series, leading to some confusion over the title appearing as a sequel.

Reception

See also
 George Foreman's KO Boxing, Beam Software's spiritual follow-up/progression of Power Punch II''.

References

External links
Guru Larry of ScrewAttack's Video Retrospective on Power Punch II & its lineage
Power Punch 2 at Mobygames

1992 video games
Boxing video games
Nintendo Entertainment System games
Nintendo Entertainment System-only games
North America-exclusive video games
Piko Interactive games
Punch-Out!!
Video games developed in Australia
Single-player video games
ASC Games games